The Cohors VI Nerviorum was an auxiliary unit of Roman Army Cohors quinquagenaria peditata type attested in the Roman province of Britannia from the second century to the early fifth century AD.

Service in Britannia

The cohort was based at Greatchesters fort on Hadrian's Wall from the second to the fourth century AD. Inscriptions found at the Antonine Wall in Scotland state that 480 men of the Cohors VI Nerviorum served at Rough Castle Fort between 156–162AD. One of its commanders was a centurion named Flavius Betto. 

The cohort also rebuilt part of the Virosidum fort in present North Yorkshire around 205-208AD. In AD 205, whilst stationed at Virosium, the Prefect of the Cohort was Lucius Vinicius Pius.

References

Auxiliary infantry units of ancient Rome
Military history of Roman Britain